A Master Stroke is a 1920 American silent comedy film directed by Chester Bennett and starring Earle Williams, Vola Vale and Lee Hill.

Cast
 Earle Williams as Yale Durant
 Vola Vale as Minnie Patton
 Lee Hill as Jack Millington
 Henry A. Barrows as Sam Millington 
 John Elliott as George Trevor
 Rhea Haines as Blanche Trevor
 Frank Crayne as Harry Chapman
 Paul Weigel as Hodge

References

Bibliography
 Paul C. Spehr & Gunnar Lundquist. American Film Personnel and Company Credits, 1908-1920. McFarland, 1996.

External links
 

1920 films
1920 comedy films
1920s English-language films
American silent feature films
Silent American comedy films
American black-and-white films
Films directed by Chester Bennett
Vitagraph Studios films
1920s American films